This is a list of episodes for the ninth season (1994–95) of the television series Married... with Children.

This season rounds out the cast of Al's friends by introducing Griff, who works at Gary's Shoes with Al, and Ike. Steve Rhoades also makes his final two appearances during this season. The season also includes the cancellation of Psycho Dad, Bud getting a job as a driving examiner and the first appearances of shoe store owner Gary (who turns out to be a woman), Marcy's niece Amber and reporter Miranda Veracruz de la Hoya Cardinal. David Garrison makes his fifth and final guest appearance.

Katey Sagal missed one episode and had short appearances in three episodes. Amanda Bearse also missed one episode.

Episode 24 "Radio Free Trumaine" was a back-door spin-off pilot that was not picked up.

Episodes

DVD release
This season was included with every other season on a boxset from Sony Pictures Home Entertainment. On August 19, 2009, it was released on an individual set.

The DVD was first released in Australia on October 22, 2008 by Sony Pictures Home Entertainment, without any bonus features.

Note

 A. 'Bootsie' is a pseudonym for J. Stanford Parker.

References

1994 American television seasons
1995 American television seasons
09